Cachia is a surname of Scottish origin, coming from the kingdom of Dál Riata. It derives from the Gaelic form "MacEachainn". The surname "Cachia" can be traced to Knoydart. The surname has various variants, as a result of translation from Gaelic to English. The variants include  McEachan, McGeachan, McKechnie, McGeachie. One of the first people from the Cachia family to emigrate to the United States was Thomas McKeachie in 1797.

People with this surname include:

Jaryd Cachia (born 1991), Australian rules footballer
Jamie Cachia (born 1987), Scottish field hockey goalkeeper
Therese Comodini Cachia(born 1973), Maltese lawyer and politician
Pierre Cachia (1921-2017), Egyptian academic
Alfredo Cachia Zammit (1890–1960), Maltese politician and philanthropist
Michele Cachia (1760–1839), Maltese architect and military engineer
Antonio Cachia (1739–1813), Maltese architect, engineer and archaeologist
Domenico Cachia ( 1690–1761), Maltese capomastro

References

Scottish surnames